Saint-Julien-de-la-Nef (Languedocien: Sent Julian de la Nau) is a commune in the Gard department in southern France.

Population

See also
Communes of the Gard department

References

Communes of Gard